Roberto Pimenta Vinagre Filho (born 4 April 1992), commonly known as Betinho, is a Brazilian professional footballer who plays as a defensive midfielder for Chapecoense.

Club career
Born in Apeú, Castanhal, Pará, Betinho started his career with Remo in 2010. He only became a regular starter for the side during the 2012 Campeonato Paraense, but left the club in May of that year as his contract expired, and agreed to a deal with Tombense.

Betinho initially agreed to a loan deal with Série B side América de Natal in August 2012, but the deal later collapsed due to an injury, and he returned to Tombense for the 2013 Campeonato Mineiro. After being a regular starter for the club, loans to Madureira, América Mineiro, Mirassol, Atlético Goianiense, Guarani and Figueirense followed, where he was regularly used for most sides.

On 4 December 2019, still owned by Tombense, Betinho joined Série A side Sport Recife on loan for the campaign. He made his top tier debut at the age of 28 on 8 August 2020, starting in a 3–2 home win against Ceará.

Career statistics

References

External links

1992 births
Living people
Brazilian footballers
Sportspeople from Pará
Association football midfielders
Campeonato Brasileiro Série A players
Campeonato Brasileiro Série B players
Campeonato Brasileiro Série C players
Campeonato Brasileiro Série D players
Clube do Remo players
Tombense Futebol Clube players
Madureira Esporte Clube players
América Futebol Clube (MG) players
Mirassol Futebol Clube players
Atlético Clube Goianiense players
Guarani FC players
Figueirense FC players
Sport Club do Recife players
People from Castanhal